The Theory of Money and Credit is a 1912 economics book written by Ludwig von Mises, originally published in German as Theorie des Geldes und der Umlaufsmittel. In it Mises expounds on his theory of the origins of money through his regression theorem, which is based on logical argumentation. It is one of the foundational works of the Misesian branch of the Austrian School of economic thought.

Commodity money exists today. Mises looks at the origin, nature and value of money, and its effect on determining monetary policy. It does not concern all adaptations of money. He uses the so-called  regression theorem, a statement backed by a step by step, logical reasoning. Mises explains why money is demanded in its own right. According to Mises, money has historically come about after there has been a demand for the money commodity in a barter economy.

Applications
Along with Carl Menger's Principles of Economics, and Eugen von Böhm-Bawerk's Capital and Interest, the book is one of the foundational works of the Austrian School.

Publication history
 1912: Vienna: Theorie des Geldes und der Umlaufsmittel.
 1924: 2nd edition in German.
 1934: London: Jonathan Cape Ltd. First translation (by Harold E. Batson) into English. The German word Umlaufsmittel literally translates as "means of circulation" and was translated into the text of the English version as "fiduciary media".  However, the publisher thought the unusual terminology would irritate readers and substituted "money and credit" in the title, thereby losing the specific distinction Mises had made in selecting his original term.

 1953: New Haven, Conn.: Yale University Press. Part Four was added by Mises to this English language edition
 1971: Irvington-on-Hudson, N.Y.: Foundation for Economic Education.
 1978: Irvington-on-Hudson, N.Y.: Foundation for Economic Education.
 1981: Indianapolis,. Ind. Liberty Fund. . 541 pages. Hardcover. (Softcover ).
 2009: Auburn, Al. Ludwig von Mises Institute. Hardcover

Criticism
According to Michael Hendricks, "the regression theorem does a good job of explaining the creation of money, however it does not necessarily apply to all forms of money."

References

External links
 The Theory of Money and Credit, 1953 edition:
 Full text in HTML
 The Theory of Money and Credit, 2009 edition:
 Full text in PDF
 Foreword to the 1981 Edition by Murray Rothbard

1912 non-fiction books
Books by Ludwig von Mises
Jonathan Cape books